Nobleton is an unincorporated community and census-designated place (CDP) in Hernando County, Florida, United States. The population was 282 at the 2010 census, up from 160 at the 2000 census.

Geography
It sits on the southwest bank of the Withlacoochee River, which forms the border with Sumter County.

Demographics

As of the census of 2000, there were 160 people, 77 households, and 46 families residing in the CDP. The racial makeup of the CDP was 99.38% White, and 0.62% from two or more races. Hispanic or Latino of any race were 1.88% of the population.

There were 77 households, out of which 20.8% had children under the age of 18 living with them, 45.5% were married couples living together, 10.4% had a female householder with no husband present, and 39.0% were non-families. 32.5% of all households were made up of individuals, and 28.6% had someone living alone who was 65 years of age or older. The average household size was 2.08 and the average family size was 2.55.

In the CDP, the population was spread out, with 19.4% under the age of 18, 2.5% from 18 to 24, 26.9% from 25 to 44, 21.3% from 45 to 64, and 30.0% who were 65 years of age or older. The median age was 46 years. For every 100 females, there were 107.8 males. For every 100 females age 18 and over, there were 89.7 males.

The median income for a household in the CDP was $25,417, and the median income for a family was $25,139. Males had a median income of $52,656 versus $31,250 for females. The per capita income for the CDP was $9,782. About 48.5% of families and 50.8% of the population were below the poverty line, including 80.0% of those under the age of eighteen and none of those 65 or over.

See also
Withlacoochee State Trail
Nobleton Wayside Park

References

Census-designated places in Hernando County, Florida
Unincorporated communities in Hernando County, Florida